András Gyöngyösi (born 23 January 1968) is a Hungarian water polo player. He competed at the 1988 Summer Olympics, the 1992 Summer Olympics and the 1996 Summer Olympics.

References

1968 births
Living people
Hungarian male water polo players
Olympic water polo players of Hungary
Water polo players at the 1988 Summer Olympics
Water polo players at the 1992 Summer Olympics
Water polo players at the 1996 Summer Olympics
Water polo players from Budapest